Oh No (stylized in all caps) is the twelfth album by American experimental band Xiu Xiu. It was released on March 26, 2021, via Polyvinyl. It is described as a "duets album". Its lead single, "A Bottle of Rum" featuring Liz Harris was released on January 27, 2021.

Background 
Oh No is made up entirely of duets. It was announced along with the release of its lead single on January 27, 2021.

Composition 
According to frontrunner Jamie Stewart, the features on the album reflect people that helped him realize that the "ratio of beautiful humans to shitty humans is more like 60/40", rather than what he had always assumed was "1/99". He also explained that the album's lead single was inspired by Grouper's "Heavy Water/I’d Rather Be Sleeping".

Critical reception 

Oh No received positive reviews from critics. On Metacritic, it holds a score of 73/100 out of 10 reviews, indicating "generally favorable reviews". In particular, A Bottle of Rum featuring Liz Harris was well received by critics. The track has been called an "electro-pop stunner", and one of the best songs of the week. Writing for Mxdwn, Aaron Grech claimed that the indie pop track "blends Xiu Xiu's eclectic chord progressions and vocal styles, with Harris’ more spacious vocals and lo-fi ambiance".

Reviewing the album for AllMusic, Heather Phares wrote how the album was, "Embodying hard times as well as the way friends lift each other out of them, Oh No also exemplifies the drama, mystery, and deeply felt emotions that have made Xiu Xiu a vital musical force for decades." In the assessment for musicOMH, Matt Costell felt that by, "Embracing the participatory rather than lurking in personal mistrust, and supplementing their formerly disconsolate narratives with unusually contented flourishes, these diverse new manifestations substantially demonstrate that Xiu Xiu still exist in a universe of their own design, but that maybe they’re ready to temporarily negotiate ours once more." In the review for Pitchfork, Brian Howe highlighted the album's accessibility; " By not trying to shock us, Stewart actually surprises us, and OH NO makes it easier to be a Xiu Xiu fan than it’s been in years."

Writing for The Skinny, Tony Inglis was more critical in his review of the album, claiming that "The production is exceptionally murky – mostly collaborators move through the dark, uncertain world Stewart manifests with his Scott Walker-like crooning of glossolalia." Clare Martin also shared similar sentiments in the review for Paste, stating that "Xiu Xiu’s esoteric lyrics and challenging, textured sounds are part of what make them so singular as a group, but can also be overdone. OH NO’s moving moments of catharsis and uplifting hope are muted by how exhaustingly over-the-top the rest of the album feels."

Track listing 
All songs written by Angela Seo and Jamie Stewart, except where noted, and produced by Seo, Lawrence English and Greg Saunier.

Notes
 "Oh No" and "Ants" are stylized in all caps.
 "One Hundred Years" is a cover version of The Cure song featured on their 1982 album Pornography.

Personnel 
Credits adapted from Tidal.

Xiu Xiu
 Jamie Stewart – autoharp, bajo quinto, banjo, bass guitar, design, drums, engineer, guitar, mandolin, organ, percussion, sampling, stylophone, synthesizer, viola, vocals, xylophone
 Angela Seo – design, gong, harmonium, percussion, piano, producer, synthesizer bass, vocals

Additional personnel

 Jonathan Meiburg – animal sounds, vocals
 Greg Saunier – bass guitar, cymbals, engineer, guitar, producer, sampling, synthesizer, vocals
 Charlie Looker – bass guitar, guitar
 David Kendrick – bongos, drums, percussion
 Danelle Abad – design
 Jherek Bischoff – double bass
 Zachary Dawes – double bass, bass guitar
 Angus Andrew – engineer, vocals
 Ben Chisholm – engineer
 Brandon Jay – engineer
 Dan Duszynski – engineer
 Dirk Dresselhaus – engineer
 Justin Higgins – engineer
 Owen Pallett – engineer
 Paul Beauchamp – engineer
 Haley Fohr – engineer, vocals
 Twin Shadow – engineer, saxophone, vocals
 Alan Douches – mastering
 John Congleton – Optigan, synthesizer
 Lawrence English – producer
 Alice Bag – vocals
 Deb Demure – vocals
 Fabrizio Modonese Palumbo – vocals
 Gwendolyn Sanford – vocals
 Liz Harris – vocals
 Sharon Van Etten – vocals
 Susanne Sachsse – vocals
 Valerie Diaz – vocals

References 

2021 albums
Xiu Xiu albums
Polyvinyl Record Co. albums